The LSWR 460 class was a class of express passenger 4-4-0 steam locomotives designed for the London and South Western Railway by William Adams. Twenty were constructed by Neilson and Company and Robert Stephenson and Company in 1884, and one in 1887.

Adams had originally ordered ten locomotives from each manufacturer in 1884. In 1887, Robert Stephenson and Company built an additional locomotive for display at a Jubilee exhibition in Newcastle upon Tyne, after which, it was later sold to the LSWR. The class were numbered 147, 460–478 and 526, and were a small-wheeled version of the 445 class. 

All except 526 were renumbered into the duplicate list as 0147, 0460–0478 between 1908 and 1924.

All passed to the Southern Railway at the grouping in 1923. Withdrawals started in the following year, with the last two, 467 and 470 being withdrawn in 1929. All were scrapped.

References 

460
4-4-0 locomotives
Neilson locomotives
Robert Stephenson and Company locomotives
Railway locomotives introduced in 1884
Scrapped locomotives
Standard gauge steam locomotives of Great Britain